The men's snooker team tournament at the 2010 Asian Games in Guangzhou took place on November 13–15 at the Asian Games Town Gymnasium.

Schedule
All times are China Standard Time (UTC+08:00)

Results

Bracket

Final

Top half

Bottom half

Preliminary

Last 16

Quarterfinals

Semifinals

Final

Non-participating athletes

References
 Results
 Draw

External links
 Cue Sports results at the official site of 2010 Asian Games 

Cue sports at the 2010 Asian Games